Stupid Teenagers Must Die!   is a 2006 spoof film directed by Jeff C. Smith and written by Smith and Curtis Andersen. During production and initial festival screenings, the film was titled Blood & Guts, but before sending it to distributors, the change to the current title was made to better reflect the humour intended by the filmmakers, as they thought the original title implied more carnage than the film supplied.

Plot
The story revolves around a group group of teens who meet in a haunted house to hold a seance.  The characters include a hero (Jovan Meredith), a naive girlfriend (Ashley Schneider / Aurora Sta. Maria), a goth girl (Renee Dorian), a tough guy (Devin Marble), a ditzy blonde girl (Lindsay Gareth), a shy geek in love with the blonde (Matt Blashaw), two big nerds (Cory Assink & Jonathan Brett), and a pair of lipstick lesbians (Jamie Carson & Christina DeRosa).  Strange things begin to occur 
as they enter the house,strange incidents including nudity, pitfalls and even deaths, while the hero works to save the day before every teenager is dead.

Development

In an early interview with Unbound, director Jeff C. Smith revealed that he and co-producers Sara Parrell and Curtis Andersen, as well as actor Jovan Meredith all at one time worked together in the Entertainment division at Disneyland in Anaheim, California. Smith shared that it was during their employment at the park, and when the group had collaborated on an earlier project, he learned that Jovan had skills he wished to include in a future project... the one which became Stupid Teenagers Must Die.  Even before the film had entered post-production, the crew had optimistically scheduled its premiere as Blood & Guts at Cinespace in Hollywood, California for July 13, 2006. However, the film was not ready and director Smith was compelled to screen the incomplete rough-cut he did have, as a "test screening". The audience panned the project. Taking the lesson of premature release to heart, Smith spent the next several months finishing the film's editing in preparation for its subsequent screenings.

Cast
Jovan Meredith as Kane.
Ashley Schneider as Julie.
Devin Marble as Alfie.
Lindsay Gareth as Tiffany.
Renee Dorian as Madeline.
Cory Assink as Geek One.
Jonathan Brett as Geek Two.
Will Deutsch as Ryan.
Jamie Carson as Sissy.
Christina DeRosa as Jamie.
Matt Blashaw as Michael.
Aurora Sta. Maria as Soup.

Reception
Intended by the director to appeal to "movie geeks", the film has received mixed response from genre reviewers. Dorkgasm Senior Staff Writer Kenneth Holm felt that with it being a low-budget film, he began his viewing with lowered expectations but opined that he should have lowered them even more. After panning it in his review, he concluded that he would recommend it only as an "exercise for other budding filmmakers to see what missteps to avoid when making their first movie." Conversely, the reviewer for Dead Lantern found the film to be worth watching and great fun, remarking that he enjoyed the "back story" of why the house was haunted in the first place and feels that it would be a great prequel, and concludes by recommending it as a "comedy that will make even the most jaded horror elitists smile," and Fatally Yours called it a "film that knows how to have a good time!" in a review that acclaimed the film as "one of the most fun and enjoyable low-budget films I’ve seen in quite some time"; however, a reviewer for The Movies Made Me Do It, decided that even with touting itself as a low-budget spoof, the filmmakers lost track of the fact that they were making a spoof, resulting in them trying too hard at the wrong goals and taking the film too seriously, when it could have remained funny throughout, leading to them "basically creating a slasher film from the eighties minus the things that made those movies so appealing in the first place: massive body counts, T&A, and a neat villain for the heroes to contend with", concluding that "It's never even remotely scary", and "it's simply not funny either save for a couple of one-liners." The film had a major write-up in the October 2007 issue of Fangoria magazine.

Release

The completed film was first screened October 14, 2006 at the Movie Nation Festival and then shown at many additional festivals.  Most notable among the screenings was the Backseat Film Festival where the film won Best Film Title and actress Lindsay Gareth won the prestigious "Best Breasts" award. It was offered for release on DVD in the US by Vanguard International Cinema and internationally by Singa Home Entertainment on September 25, 2007.  Three weeks prior to the DVD release, director Smith shared that the distributor allowed them a maximum of 125 minutes on the DVD, so he had chosen to include a 30-minute "making of" documentary titled Movies Are Bullshit! The Making Of Stupid Teenagers Must Die!, with commentary by director Jeff C. Smith and actor Jovan Meredit, an audience reaction track from the premiere, and an interview with cast member Will Deutsch.

References

External links 
 
 

2006 films
American comedy horror films
2006 horror films
2000s English-language films
American parody films
American teen horror films
Parodies of horror
2000s American films